In the United States government, the Bureau of Western Hemisphere Affairs (WHA) is a part of the U.S. Department of State, charged with implementing U.S. foreign policy and promoting U.S. interests in the Western Hemisphere, as well as advising the Under Secretary of State for Political Affairs. It is headed by the Assistant Secretary of State for Western Hemisphere Affairs, who is currently Brian A. Nichols.

Organization
The offices of the Bureau of Western Hemisphere Affairs direct, coordinate, and supervise U.S. government activities within the region, including political, economic, consular, public diplomacy, and administrative management issues.

Office of Andean Affairs – Coordinates policy on Bolivia, Colombia, Ecuador, Peru, and Venezuela
Office of Brazilian and Southern Cone Affairs – Coordinates policy on Argentina, Brazil, Chile, Paraguay, and Uruguay
Office of Canadian Affairs – Oversees Canada–United States relations
Office of Caribbean Affairs – Coordinates policy on Antigua and Barbuda, the Bahamas, Barbados, Dominica, the Dominican Republic, Grenada, Guyana, Jamaica, Saint Kitts and Nevis, Saint Lucia, Saint Vincent and the Grenadines, Suriname and Trinidad and Tobago
Office of the Coordinator for Cuban Affairs – Oversees Cuba–United States relations
Office of Central American Affairs – Coordinates policy on Belize, Costa Rica, El Salvador, Guatemala, Honduras, Nicaragua, and Panama
Office of Economic Policy and Summit Coordination – Oversees policy related to trade, energy, finance, and the Summits of the Americas
Executive Office – Responsible for human resources and management support services for the bureau's overseas missions
Office of Mexican Affairs – Oversees Mexico–United States relations
Office of Public Diplomacy and Public Affairs – Oversees public diplomacy activities at WHA's overseas posts
Office of Haitian Affairs - Oversees Haiti–United States relations
Office of Policy Planning and Coordination – Responsible for the bureau's strategic planning and evaluation

The Bureau of Western Hemisphere Affairs also oversees the United States Mission to the Organization of American States.

References

External links
 

Western Hemisphere
United States diplomacy
United States–Caribbean relations
United States–Central American relations
United States–South American relations
United States–North American relations
Antigua and Barbuda–United States relations
Argentina–United States relations
Bahamas–United States relations
Barbados–United States relations
Belize–United States relations
Bolivia–United States relations
Brazil–United States relations
Canada–United States relations
Chile–United States relations
Colombia–United States relations
Costa Rica–United States relations
Cuba–United States relations
Dominica–United States relations
Dominican Republic–United States relations
Ecuador–United States relations
El Salvador–United States relations
Grenada–United States relations
Guatemala–United States relations
Guyana–United States relations
Haiti–United States relations
Honduras–United States relations
Jamaica–United States relations
Mexico–United States relations
Nicaragua–United States relations
Panama–United States relations
Paraguay–United States relations
Peru–United States relations
Saint Kitts and Nevis–United States relations
Saint Lucia–United States relations
Saint Vincent and the Grenadines–United States relations
Suriname–United States relations
Trinidad and Tobago–United States relations
United States–Uruguay relations
United States–Venezuela relations